Drepanulatrix quadraria is a species of geometrid moth in the family Geometridae. It is found in North America.

The MONA or Hodges number for Drepanulatrix quadraria is 6685.

Subspecies
These two subspecies belong to the species Drepanulatrix quadraria:
 Drepanulatrix quadraria quadraria
 Drepanulatrix quadraria usta Rindge, 1949

References

Further reading

 

Caberini
Articles created by Qbugbot
Moths described in 1882